The 6th Corps (Turkish: 6. Kolordu) is a field corps of the Turkish Army. It is headquartered at Adana in Adana Province, and is part of Second Army.

The 1974 Turkish military operations in Cyprus consisted of two distinct offensives, the first being "Atilla 1", which commenced in the early hours of July 20, 1974, with an amphibious landing force, directed by the 6th Corps, forming a beachhead at Kyrenia's Five Mile Beach. It comprised only infantry troops, but was supported by rolling air and naval artillery attacks, and met with limited resistance from the Cyprus National Guard, which was in disarray as a result of the July 15, 1974 coup. The majority of fighting ceased on the 23rd of July, though sporadic clashes continued after this date until the 14th of August. "Atilla 1" successfully achieved its objective of forming a bridgehead with the Turkish Cypriot enclave of Agyrta-Nicosia.

When the corps that carried out the Cyprus Operation landed in Cyprus, its name was changed to the Cyprus Turkish Peace Forces. It was re-established immediately after the operation.

6th Corps was reported in 2004 to consist of:
 5th Armored Brigade (Gaziantep)
 39th Mechanized Infantry Brigade (İskenderun)
 106th Artillery Regiment (Islahiye)

The corps was temporarily reduced in status to a division, the 6th Mechanised Infantry Division, in late 2011 after the arrest of Lieutenant General Mehmet Eröz as part of the "Internet memorandum" case, but by June 2012 Turkish press reports were reporting that it would be upgraded in status to corps level once more.

In fact, it was only 2021, it was raised to the corps level again and Lieutenant General Metin Tokel was appointed as the commander.

References

Phase Line Attila: The Amphibious Campaign for Cyprus, 1974, by Edward J. Erickson and Mesut Uyar. Quantico, VA: Marine Corps Univ. Press, 2020. 235 pages. Free hardcover and e-book.
Hughes-Wilson, John. "The Forgotten War: A Brief History of the Battle for Cyprus, 1974." The RUSI Journal 156, no. 5 (2011): 84-93.
Lale Sarıibrahimoğlu, Chapter 5, 'Turkish Armed Forces' in Umit Cizre (ed.), 'Democratic Oversight and Reform of the Security Sector in Turkey,' LIT/DCAF 2008, .

Corps of Turkey